The Capital Premier League is an amateur status league competition run by Capital Football for Association football clubs located in the southern part of the North Island, New Zealand. It is at the third level of New Zealand Football behind the national club based New Zealand National League and leads to promotion into the Central League, which is the second highest level of club based football available to teams within the region.

League history
The Capital Premier, originally called the Wellington League, was the highest league in the Wellington Region, started in 1891. In 1896, the Venus Shield, named after the "New Venus" tobacco was donated by Cameron & Bros., America, the manufacturers. The league became known as the New Venus Shield league and the trophy was awarded to the winner of the competition each season.

In 1967, the league dropped to being the second level of competition with the formation of the Central League and called the Second Division. The Central League became the feeder league for the National Soccer League in 1970 dropping the Premier League to third level in New Zealand football. 

In 2000, the league became the Capital Premier League with the winner then playing off from the top team from Central Football's Central Federation League for a spot in the Central League.

Capital Premier League Clubs

Current clubs
As of the 2023 season.
{| class="wikitable sortable" style="width:40%;"
|-
! Club
! Location
! Home Ground(s)
|-
| Island Bay United
| Island Bay, Wellington
| Wakefield Park
|-
| Lower Hutt City
| Lower Hutt
| Fraser Park
|-
| Miramar Rangers (2)
| Miramar, Wellington
| David Farrington Park
|-
| Seatoun
| Seatoun, Wellington
| Seatoun Park
|-
| Tawa| Tawa, Wellington
| Redwood Park
|-
| Upper Hutt City| Upper Hutt
| Maidstone Park
|-
| Wainuiomata| Lower Hutt
| Richard Prouse Park
|-
| Waterside Karori (2)
| Karori, Wellington
| Karori Park
|-
| Wellington Olympic (2)
| Island Bay, Wellington
| Wakefield Park
|-
| Wellington Phoenix Reserves' (3)
| Lower Hutt
| Fraser Park
|-
|}

(2) — Denotes club's second team
(3) — Denotes club's third team

Records
Past Champions

1891 – Petone Wanderers
1892 – Queen's Park Wellington 
1893 – Wellington Rovers
1894 – Wellington Rovers
1895 – Wellington Swifts
1896 – Wellington Swifts
1897 – Wellington Swifts
1898 – Wellington Rovers
1899 – Wellington Rovers 
1900 – Diamond Wellington
1901 – Wellington Swifts
1902 – Wellington St. John's 
1903 – Wellington St. John's 
1904 – Diamond Wellington
1905 – Diamond Wellington
1906 – Diamond Wellington
1907 – Wellington Swifts
1908 – Diamond Wellington
1909 – Wellington Swifts
1910 – Ramblers Wellington 
1911 – Wellington Swifts
1912 – Hospital Porirua
1913 – Wellington Thistle 
1914 – Wellington Corinthians
1915 – Wellington Thistle 
1916–1917 – no competition''
1918 – Porirua Wellington
1919 – YMCA Wellington
1920 – Wellington Thistle
1921 – Hospital
1922 – Waterside
1923 – Waterside
1924 – YMCA
1925 – YMCA
1926 – Hospital
1927 – YMCA
1928 – YMCA
1929 – Diamond
1930 – Hospital
1931 – Petone
1932 – Marist
1933 – Petone
1934 – Marist
1935 – Hospital
1936 – Hospital
1937 – Waterside
1938 – Waterside
1939 – Petone
1940 – Waterside
1941 – Seatoun
1942 – Hospital
1943 – Waterside
1944 – Waterside
1945 – Marist
1946 – Marist
1947 – Marist
1948 – Waterside
1949 – Seatoun
1950 – Seatoun
1951 – Seatoun
1952 – Petone
1953 – Marist
1954 – Stop Out
1955 – Stop Out
1956 – Stop Out
1957 – Seatoun
1958 – Seatoun
1959 – Northern
1960 – Railways
1961 – Northern
1962 – Northern
1963 – Diamond
1964 – Diamond
1965 – Diamond
1966 – Miramar Rangers
1967 – Hungaria
1968 – Western Suburbs
1969 – Western Suburbs
1970 – Waterside
1971 – Waterside
1972 – Wellington United Diamond
1973 – Waterside
1974 – Porirua United
1975 – Wellington United Diamond
1976 – Nelson United
1977 – Waterside
1978 – Manawatu United
1979 – Gisborne City
1980 – Miramar Rangers
1981 – Napier City Rovers
1982 – Nelson United
1983 – Stop Out
1984 – Stop Out
1985 – Manawatu United
1986 – Napier City Rovers
1987 – Waterside Karori
1988 – Waterside Karori
1989 – New Plymouth Old Boys
1990 – Petone
1991 – Wellington Olympic
1992 – Tawa
1993 – Stokes Valley
1994 – Napier City Rovers
1995 – Island Bay United
1996 – Stop Out
1997 – Island Bay United
1998 – Upper Hutt City
1999 – Napier City Rovers
2000 – Western Suburbs
2001 – Wellington United
2002 – Western Suburbs
2003 – Lower Hutt City
2004 – Miramar Rangers
2005 – Stop Out
2006 – Petone
2007 – Petone
2008 – Miramar Rangers
2009 – Tawa
2010 – Upper Hutt City
2011 – Wellington United
2012 – Upper Hutt City
2013 – Stop Out
2014 – Stop Out
2015 – Wellington United
2016 – Waterside Karori
2017 – Waterside Karori
2018 – North Wellington
2019 – Petone
2020 – Wainuiomata
2021 – Lower Hutt City
2022 – Stop Out

References

External links
 Capital Football official website

3
Sports leagues established in 1891
1891 establishments in New Zealand